Frederic Spotts (born Feb 2, 1930) is an American former diplomat and cultural historian. He was educated in Swarthmore College, Fletcher School of Law and Diplomacy and Oxford University.

Works

References

Living people
20th-century American historians
20th-century American diplomats
1930 births
Swarthmore College alumni
The Fletcher School at Tufts University alumni
Alumni of the University of Oxford
American Civil Liberties Union people
20th-century American male writers
21st-century American historians
21st-century American male writers
American male non-fiction writers